The Second Byrd Antarctic Expedition Medal was established by Act of Congress in 1936 to commemorate the Second Byrd Antarctic Expedition.

Criteria
Established by an act of congress on 2 June 1936, the Second Byrd Antarctic Expedition Medal was awarded to expedition members who spent six months, the entire winter night, at Little America.  Commanders of the expeditions ships, who commanded throughout the expedition from 1933 through 1935, were also eligible.  This criteria limited the award of the medals to 50 recipients.

Appearance
The medal is a circular a silver medallion 1 1/4 inches in diameter.  The obverse depicts the figure of Admiral Byrd, in polar clothing with a sled dog standing to the left.   To the right of the figure, in two lines, are the dates 1933 1935.  The inscription BYRD ANTARCTIC EXPEDITION arcs around the top of the medal.  The reverse has a rectangle bearing the inscription, in 14 lines: PRESENTED TO THE OFFICERS AND MEN OF THE SECOND BYRD ANT- ARCTIC EXPEDITION TO EXPRESS THE VERY HIGH ADMIRATION IN WHICH THE CONGRESS AND THE AMERICAN PEOPLE HOLD THEIR HEROIC AND UNDAUNTED ACCOMPLISHMENTS FOR SCIENCE UNEQUALLED IN THE HISTORY OF POLAR EXPLORATION.  A Ford Tri-Motor airplane appears above the tablet in relief with a dog sled, "Little America" buildings, and the sailing ship "City of New York" around the rectangle.  The medal is suspended from a solid white silk ribbon.

Notable recipients
Rear Admiral Richard E. Byrd, USN (Retired)
Harold June, USN
Thomas Poulter
Dr. Paul A. Siple, Ph.D.

References

1936 establishments in the United States
Awards established in 1936